Francis Williamson may refer to:

 Francis John Williamson (1833–1920), British portrait sculptor
 Frank S. Williamson (1865–1936), Australian poet 
 Francis Williamson (architect) (1822–1883), architect in Nottingham